Filan is a surname. Notable people with this surname include:

 Boris Filan from Elán (band)
 Frank Filan (1905–1952), photographer
 John Filan (born 1970), Australian football player
 Shane Filan (born 1979), Irish singer and songwriter
 Susan Filan (born 1959), American lawyer